The Canon de 340 mm Modèle 1887 was a heavy naval gun used as the main armament of several ships of the  (French Navy) before World War I. It equipped the  and the coast-defense ships  and .

Ammunition 
 APC (Armor-piercing, Capped) -  
 SAPC (Semi-Armor-piercing, Capped) - 
 CI (Cast iron) -

Notes

References
 
 

Naval guns of France
340 mm artillery